The 1998 Nevada gubernatorial election occurred on November 3, 1998. Incumbent Democrat Bob Miller was term limited. Republican nominee Kenny Guinn defeated Democratic nominee Jan Laverty Jones to become Governor of Nevada. This was the first open seat Nevada gubernatorial election since 1978.

Democratic primary

Candidates
Caeser D. Adamson
Jim Champagne
Patrick Matthew "Pat" Fitzpatrick, perennial candidate
John Geremia
Jan Laverty Jones, Mayor of Las Vegas
Joe Neal, Nevada State Senator
Carlo Poliak, perennial candidate
Barbara Scott, public accountant
Burvle "Ed" Swindle

Results

Republican primary

Candidates
Kenny Guinn, businessman
Lonnie Hammargren, Lieutenant Governor
Aaron Russo, businessman and film producer
Bruce Westcott, businessman

Results

General election

Results

References

1998
Nevada
Gubernatorial